Adrian Perkins (born October 23, 1985) is an American politician and attorney who served as the Mayor of Shreveport, Louisiana. Perkins is a graduate of both the United States Military Academy at West Point and Harvard Law School, and is an Army veteran. He ran for the United States Senate in 2020, losing to incumbent Republican Bill Cassidy.

Early life and education
Adrian Perkins is the grandson of a Bossier Parish sharecropper, and the youngest of three boys born to Johnny Oliver and Archie Perkins. He was raised in the Broadmoor neighborhood of Shreveport. He attended Arthur Circle, Youree Drive Middle School, and Captain Shreve High School where he was a member of the student council and the varsity football, basketball and track and field teams. Perkins was all-state in track and field in high school.

Inspired to join the United States Army following the September 11 attacks, Perkins sought and received an appointment to the United States Military Academy, a United States service academy located in West Point, New York. While at West Point, Perkins was elected class president, the first African American cadet to graduate to serve as class president in the 215-year history of the institution. Perkins was selected to be a Tillman Scholar by the Pat Tillman Foundation. He attended Harvard Law School, where he earned his Juris Doctor and served as president of the student government.

Military service
Upon graduation from West Point, Perkins was commissioned as a field artillery officer and posted at Fort Stewart, Georgia. During his career, Perkins was also posted at Fort Sill, Fort Benning, and Fort Campbell and served deployments to Iraq and Afghanistan.

Perkins served eight years in the Army, completing Ranger training and achieved the rank of captain and served as a company commander.

Adrian Perkins is a Bronze Star recipient.

2018 mayoral race 
On April 26, 2018, Perkins announced his candidacy for Mayor of Shreveport, Louisiana.

On November 6, 2018, Perkins finished first with 17,466 votes and 28.86% in the blanket primary, but did not garner the required 50 percent plus one vote to win outright.

On December 8, 2018, Perkins handily defeated incumbent Ollie Tyler in the runoff to become the 58th mayor of Shreveport. He is Shreveport's third consecutive black mayor and the second youngest mayor in the city's history.

Political positions

Public safety

Public safety was one of three major planks in Adrian Perkins mayoral campaign platform. He stressed the need for more community-oriented policing that focuses on positive, relationship building non-law enforcement interactions between police and citizens. Mayor Perkins first year in office, Part 1 crime fell 8 percent, reaching its lowest point since 1975. When compared to 1989, the highest point for Part 1 crimes on record in Shreveport, 2019 was a 60 percent decrease. Homicides saw the sharpest decline, down 29 percent from 2018.

Perkins and Police Chief Ben Raymond implemented a Supplemental Patrol Program, requiring officers not assigned to the Uniformed Services Division to ride supplemental patrol shifts periodically. This initiative contributed to the 400 added patrol shifts and 3,200 additional patrol hours logged in 2019.

Mayor Perkins and Chief Technology Officer Keith Hanson were also able to roll savings from cuts to city phone contracts into FirstNet onsite internet for police officers and fire fighters.

Economic development 
Mayor Perkins has focused on expanding Shreveport's healthcare corridor. He has also worked to expand Shreveport's budding aviation maintenance industry and the local tech sector. In July 2019, Indiana-based SuperATV announced a $4.35 million investment at its Shreveport site, bringing 117 direct and indirect jobs.

Technology 
Mayor Perkins campaigned on a smart-city platform. Once in office, he appointed the city's first Chief Technology Officer, Keith Hanson, a former software executive. Mayor Perkins' administration used technology to create an online interactive city budget, dubbed the "People's Budget."  Under Mayor Perkins leadership, the city hired its first data-scientist who discovered an accounting oversight from previous administrations that disclosed several million dollars, which was used to bolster the city's anemic reserve fund. The IT department also renegotiated its phone contracts, saving the city tens of thousands of dollars.

Municipal budget 
Mayor Perkins inherited a $1.2 million deficit. To address this issue, the Perkins administration cut expenditures and increased revenues. Perkins' first proposed budget was passed by City Council on December 10, 2019, and it was Shreveport's first balanced budget in nearly a decade. This budget cut expenditures by 4.5 percent and was projected to bring the city's Operating Reserves up from the $1.2 million deficit in 2019 to a $2.6 million surplus by the end of 2020.

Perkins called for a monthly sanitation fee for residential and commercial garbage pick-up to be added to municipal water bills to provide sanitation workers with a pay raise and to reduce the $8.4 million subsidy from the general fund for curbside solid waste collection. The City Council passed a $7 user-fee increased on March 26, 2019.

As a result of the economic crisis caused by the COVID-19 Pandemic, the City of Shreveport experienced a projected $25 million shortfall. The Perkins administration was able to avoid furloughing or laying off city employees or eliminating essential services by proposing $25 million in cuts, including everything from "non-personnel-related expenditures to deferred capital projects and funded vacancies in nearly every department."

COVID-19 response 
Mayor Perkins was quick to act in response to the COVID-19 Pandemic. He utilized technology to geo-locate cases of COVID-19 in the City of Shreveport, noticing a concentration in densely populated, predominately African-American neighborhoods. Mayor Perkins immediately shifted resources and messaging to increase awareness of the virus and promote safe practices in these areas. He drew attention to the disproportionate toll exacted on communities of color by the virus. His response garnered national attention and a front-page story in the Washington Post.

Pants sagging ordinance 
Perkins announced in May 2019 that he opposes his city's ban on persons wearing saggy pants in public. The Shreveport City Council introduced legislation to repeal the ordinance, eventually voting to repeal on June 11, 2019. The matter promptly attracted national attention. Opposition stemmed from the fact that 98 percent of those arrested for violation of the ordinance are Black, and 100 percent of youth cited for violation of the law are Black.

Insurance change
Mayor Perkins changed the city's insurance policy. His stated goal was to "inject competition into the process and ensure that minorities, disadvantaged business owners, and Shreveport’s middle class—people who have been excluded from government work for decades—received the same opportunities as everyone else." This new policy with the Frost Company cost more for  less coverage. The change took place the day before he officially took office, apparently through a staff error.

2020 U.S. Senate campaign 

On July 22, 2020, Perkins announced that he was running for the United States Senate in 2020, challenging incumbent Republican Bill Cassidy. Perkins was endorsed by former President Barack Obama, Governor John Bel Edwards, Democratic vice presidential nominee Kamala Harris, and former presidential candidates Elizabeth Warren, Pete Buttigieg, and Cory Booker. Perkins also received endorsements from VoteVets, the Democratic Senatorial Campaign Committee and the Executive Committee of the Democratic (Louisiana) State Central Committee. Other notable endorsements included former U.S. Senators J. Bennett Johnston and Mary Landrieu, former New Orleans Mayor Mitch Landrieu, and veteran Democratic Party strategist Donna Brazile.

Mayor Perkins cited the pandemic and Cassidy's lack of leadership as the reasons for his Senate bid, saying, "This is a moment for strong, decisive leadership in Washington. The pain and suffering I've seen has driven me to this decision...we can't afford to give Sen. Cassidy another chance."

However, Perkins' run for the senate was not successful. On November 3, 2020, Cassidy was re-elected with 59.3% of the vote; Perkins received 19%.

Awards 
On Nov. 8, 2019, the Pat Tillman Foundation honored Perkins with the organization's 2019 Make Your Mark Award "for embodying the values of service, scholarship, humble leadership and impact in [his] work and daily life."

References

External links
Government website

|-

1985 births
21st-century American politicians
African-American mayors in Louisiana
United States Army personnel of the Iraq War
United States Army personnel of the War in Afghanistan (2001–2021)
Harvard Law School alumni
Living people
Mayors of Shreveport, Louisiana
United States Army soldiers
United States Military Academy alumni
Louisiana Democrats
Candidates in the 2020 United States Senate elections